Paweł Kowalski (10 February 1937 – 3 June 2016) was a Polish footballer. He played in four matches for the Poland national football team in 1967.

References

External links
 

1937 births
2016 deaths
Polish footballers
Poland international footballers
Place of birth missing
Association footballers not categorized by position